Sur les traces du Bembeya Jazz (In the Steps of Bembeya Jazz) is a 2007 documentary about the Guinean band Bembeya Jazz.

Synopsis 
In 1961, in a small village in the middle of the Guinean tropical forest, a music band is born. This band will become one of the biggest orchestras of modern Africa. It is Bembeya Jazz. This orchestra, symbolizing the Guinean revolution of Ahmed Sékou Touré, managed to rock the whole African continent with their music. Forty years later, we go back to its roots.

Awards 
 FESPACO 2007

External links
BBC review (audio) - Africa at the movies - Fespaco 2007

Creative Commons-licensed documentary films
Burkinabé documentary films
Documentary films about jazz music and musicians
2000s French-language films
2007 documentary films
2007 films
Documentary films about African music